Matador Field is a baseball venue located on the campus of Cal State Northridge in Los Angeles, California, United States, more specifically in the San Fernando Valley district of Northridge. It is home to the Cal State Northridge Matadors baseball team, a member of the Division I Big West Conference.  The venue was opened on March 4, 1961, with the Matadors losing 10–8 to Claremont-Mudd.  The facility has a capacity of 1,200.

Renovations
In 1975, a three-year renovation process began which saw a new infield, scoreboard, batting cages, fencing, bleachers, and press box installed.  A clubhouse adjoining the Matador dugout was constructed in 1981.  A new infield was installed in 1993, followed by a new scoreboard and video replay screen over the right field fence in 1996.

In 2017, new renovation plans were revealed with a total cost of $15 Million. The stadium will expand its capacity and overhaul its entire look including: new concession stands, new entry way honoring the Matadors' baseball history, an expanded hitting facility, state of the art team building, stair back seating with premium areas, new restrooms, children's play area, and grass berm seating.

Gallery

See also
 List of NCAA Division I baseball venues

References

College baseball venues in the United States
Baseball venues in Los Angeles
Cal State Northridge Matadors baseball
Baseball venues in California
1961 establishments in California
Sports venues completed in 1961